William N. Robinson served as a member of the 1869–71 California State Assembly, representing California's 1st State Assembly district.

References

Members of the California State Assembly
Year of birth missing
Year of death missing